The Cerro Casale mine is one of the largest gold mines in the Chile and in the world. The mine is located in the northern part of Chile in Atacama Region. The mine has estimated reserves of 23 million oz of gold and 58.7 million oz of silver.

References 

Gold mines in Chile
Mines in Atacama Region
Surface mines in Chile

es:Cerro Casale (mina)